Wacław Szymanowski (23 August 185922 July 1930) was a Polish sculptor and painter. He is best known for his statue of composer Frédéric Chopin in Warsaw's Royal Baths Park (Łazienki Park).

Life

Until about 1895 the painter-cum-sculptor occupied himself mainly with executing genre paintings of Polish mountaineers and Hutsuls, and portraits.

He then turned to sculpture, creating compositions in Art Nouveau-Symbolist style. He designed the monuments to Artur Grottger in Kraków (1907) and to Frédéric Chopin in Warsaw; tomb monuments (including his father's at Warsaw's Powązki Cemetery); and portrait busts. He died in Warsaw at age 70.

Chopin monument

In 1907 Szymanowski designed the bronze statue of Frédéric Chopin that now stands in Warsaw's Łazienki Park. The statue was originally to have been erected in 1910, on the centenary of Chopin's birth, but it was delayed by controversy about the design, then by the outbreak of World War I. The statue was finally cast and erected after the war, in 1926.

See also

List of Poles—Fine arts

Notes

References
 Encyklopedia powszechna PWN (PWN Universal Encyclopedia), vol. 4, Warsaw, Państwowe Wydawnictwo Naukowe, 1976.
 Encyklopedia Warszawy (Encyclopedia of Warsaw), 1994.

External links

1859 births
1930 deaths
Polish sculptors
Polish male sculptors
19th-century Polish painters
19th-century Polish male artists
20th-century Polish painters
20th-century Polish male artists
Artists from Warsaw
Art Nouveau painters
Art Nouveau sculptors
20th-century sculptors
19th-century sculptors
Polish male painters